Banner County is a county in the western part of the U.S. state of Nebraska in the Great Plains region of the United States. As of the 2010 United States Census, its population was 690. Its county seat is the unincorporated community of Harrisburg; there are no incorporated municipalities within the county.

In the Nebraska license plate system, Banner County is represented by the prefix 85 (it had the eighty-fifth largest number of vehicles registered in the county when the license plate system was established in 1922).

Banner County is part of the Scottsbluff, NE Micropolitan Statistical Area.

History
When Nebraska became a state in 1867, a single county encompassed the entire Panhandle. In 1870, the Panhandle's southern half was organized as Cheyenne County. The arrival of increasing numbers of settlers led to the partitioning of the county in 1888: the eastern third became Deuel County; the middle third became present-day Cheyenne County; and the western third became Kimball, Scotts Bluff, and Banner Counties.
The last of these was named by citizens who declared it would become the state's "banner county", and "the brightest star in the constellation of Nebraska counties".

Upon the county's organization, the settlement of Ashford was chosen as the temporary county seat. Four communities aspired to be chosen as the permanent county seat: Ashford, Harrisburg, Freeport, and Banner. Two special elections proved necessary before Harrisburg was chosen.

The initial settlement of the area was by cattle ranchers, drawn by good pastures in the Pumpkin Creek valley. In the late 1880s, these open-range ranchers were displaced by an influx of settlers; by 1890, almost every quarter-section (160 acres, or 65 ha) was claimed by homesteaders. However, the good moisture years that had attracted these settlers were followed by a severe drought in 1893 and 1894, which drove many of the new settlers away; the number of farms in the county declined by more than half, from 565 in 1890 to 226 in 1900. The land thus vacated was again used by ranchers, who raised both crops and cattle. The 1904 passage of the Kinkaid Act, which allowed homesteaders to claim  brought a new wave of settlers; however, even these larger tracts were often insufficient to support a family, and many of the Kinkaid claims were eventually sold to established cattle ranchers.

The county's growth was hindered by the absence of railroads: the nearest lines ran through Kimball,  to the south, and Gering,  to the north. Roads were also slow to develop in the county: in 1921, only dirt roads existed. The difficulty of reaching markets tended to discourage commercial crop farming in the county.

Irrigation
Farmers responded by resorting to irrigation. The first irrigation well was drilled by the late 1920s, and others quickly followed. By the late 20th century, center-pivot irrigation systems were in use through much of the county. 
By 2000, the Pumpkin Creek basin had approximately 500 registered irrigation wells.
Groundwater pumping combined with drought conditions ended surface flow in Pumpkin Creek by 1993, and significantly reduced the valley's groundwater levels. Complicating matters, lawsuits were filed contending water use in the Pumpkin Creek valley depleted flows into Lake McConaughy and interfered with the prior water rights of downstream irrigators.

ICBMs

Beginning in the early 1960s, intercontinental ballistic missiles (ICBMs), based at Warren Air Force Base near Cheyenne, Wyoming, were installed in western Nebraska, Wyoming, and Colorado. From 1960 to 1963, 90 Atlas sites were constructed in Nebraska. Construction of the launch sites, and upgrading of the roads leading to them, led to an economic boom in western Nebraska. Beginning in 1963, the Atlas series was replaced by Minuteman missiles, which used solid instead of liquid fuel, and which were launched from underground silos. In the 1970s, there were 82 Minuteman III sites in the Panhandle, of which 20 were located in Banner County.

Geography

Banner County lies on what was once a tableland sloping away from the Rocky Mountains. Over geologic history, it was eroded by Pumpkin Creek and other watercourses, and much of the county now lies below the original High Plains level. The county can be divided into four major geographic divisions: the low-lying and relatively flat valley of Pumpkin Creek, which occupies about 40% of the county's area; a tableland, in places smooth and in others deeply dissected, occupying the southern one-third of the county; the Wildcat Hills, a highly dissected escarpment that crosses the county's northwestern portion; and a small portion of the North Platte River valley in the county's northeastern corner.

Adjacent counties
The western edge of Banner County abuts the eastern border of the state of Wyoming.
 Scotts Bluff County - north
 Morrill County - east
 Cheyenne County - southeast
 Kimball County - south
 Laramie County, Wyoming - west
 Goshen County, Wyoming - northwest

Highways
 Nebraska Highway 88 – runs generally east–west, from Bridgeport to La Grange, Wyoming, passing north of Harrisburg
 Nebraska Highway 71 – runs north–south, from Kimball to Gering, passing east of Harrisburg.

Demographics

Banner County's population peaked at 2,435 in 1890 and has since steadily declined. It is one of the least populated counties of Nebraska.

As of the 2000 United States Census, there were 819 people, 311 households, and 237 families in the county. The population density was 1 person per square mile (0.42/km2). There were 375 housing units at an average density of 0 per square mile (0/km2).  The racial makeup of the county was 95.85% White, 0.12% Black or African American, 0.24% Native American, 0.12% Asian, 3.05% from other races, and 0.61% from two or more races. 5.62% of the population were Hispanic or Latino of any race. 31.2% were of German, 14.4% English, 14.1% American, 8.0% Swedish, 6.8% Irish and 5.0% Norwegian ancestry.

There were 311 households, out of which 30.20% had children under the age of 18 living with them, 70.10% were married couples living together, 4.20% had a female householder with no husband present, and 23.50% were non-families. 19.90% of all households were made up of individuals, and 9.60% had someone living alone who was 65 years of age or older. The average household size was 2.63 and the average family size was 3.06.

The county population contained 28.80% under the age of 18, 3.70% from 18 to 24, 24.30% from 25 to 44, 27.20% from 45 to 64, and 16.00% who were 65 years of age or older. The median age was 40 years. For every 100 females there were 108.40 males. For every 100 females age 18 and over, there were 101.00 males.

The median income for a household in the county was $31,339, and the median income for a family was $41,538. Males had a median income of $25,250 versus $18,750 for females. The per capita income for the county was $17,149. About 12.30% of families and 13.60% of the population were below the poverty line, including 19.00% of those under age 18 and 11.10% of those age 65 or over.

Economy

About 60% of Banner County is given over to farming: chiefly winter wheat and rangeland,
but also corn, beans, sugar beets, potatoes, sunflowers, rapeseed, and millet.
In response to groundwater depletion and drought, the Natural Resources Conservation Service has developed a system of cash incentives for farmers in the Pumpkin Creek watershed who convert irrigated cropland to dryland farming.

Oil was discovered in Banner County in 1919, but the deposits were too deep to be commercially viable at that time. Petroleum production in Banner County began in 1951, and peaked in 1960, when   was produced from 397 wells. By 2009, the number of wells had fallen to about 200; but new discoveries in Weld County, Colorado prompted interest in exploring the Niobrara shale, which lies beneath western Nebraska, northeastern Colorado, and southeastern Wyoming. A 2010 sale of oil leases yielded record prices in Banner and Kimball counties.

Education
Banner County is covered by a single school district, with a K–12 school located in Harrisburg. As of 2017, the school's enrollment was 151.

Communities

Census-designated place 

 Harrisburg

It is the only community in Banner County and the county seat; it is one of two unincorporated county seats in Nebraska.

Politics
Banner County voters are strongly Republican. In only three national elections since 1900 has the county selected the Democratic Party candidate. This has only strengthened in recent years, with Republicans winning over 80% of the vote in each of the past six elections, dating back to 2000.

See also
 Big Horn Mountain
 National Register of Historic Places listings in Banner County, Nebraska

Notes

References
 Hayes, F. A., and H. L. Bedell (1921).  Soil Survey of Banner County, Nebraska.  Washington, D.C.: Government Printing Office.  Retrieved November 22, 2015.

External links
 Banner County Historical Society

 
Nebraska counties
1888 establishments in Nebraska
Populated places established in 1888